Jack Rieger (born May 3, 1897 Gorlice; died March 1, 1971, New York City) was a low budget producer and inventor.

Early years
He was the son of Leib Rieger, a tailor, and Chane Rieger. Jack Rieger worked in a New York motion picture film laboratory. On August 5, 1936, Rieger filed a voluntary petition in bankruptcy in federal court listing liabilities of $136,795 with no assets.

Motion Pictures
Rieger produced the 1934 film The Yiddish King Lear and became known as an active film maker for hire for heavyweight fights. Rieger offered a six figure sum for the rights to film the 1945 Joe Louis - Billy Conn fight, a record at the time. In 1947 Rieger acquired some footage from an uncompleted and untitled 1940 film starring Cornel Wilde and placed Wilde's scenes with several musical numbers as a 1947 film called Stairway for a Star.

He was associate producer of Captain Scarface, producer of the documentary Savage Africa where he reused the African footage in a feature film called African Manhunt and the 3D film Stereo Laffs (originally shot in 1941 but re-issued in 1953 as A Day in the Country).

Inventor
Jack Rieger held one US patent for a portable collapsible crib and play pen.

References

External links
 

American film producers
1897 births
1971 deaths
American Jews
20th-century American inventors